This is a list of the mayors and lord mayors of Birmingham in the West Midlands of England.

Birmingham has had a mayor (and elected council) since 1838. The office was raised to the dignity of lord mayor when Queen Victoria issued letters patent on 3 June 1896.

By modern convention, the Lord Mayor stands for a year, and is installed into office at the Annual Meeting of the City Council. Lord Mayors are non-political and non-executive during their term of office and act as chair of the council. As the First Citizen of Birmingham, the Lord Mayor represents not only the city but also the people of Birmingham. The honour of being Lord Mayor is now usually alternated between the Conservative, Labour and Liberal Democrat Groups. In normal circumstances the Lord Mayor becomes Deputy Lord Mayor for the following year.

Mayors of Birmingham

1838–1895

Lord Mayors of Birmingham

19th century

20th century

21st century

References 

List
Lists of mayors of places in England
Lord Mayors